Superman & Lois is an American television series developed by Todd Helbing and Greg Berlanti, based on the DC Comics characters Superman and Lois Lane, created by Jerry Siegel and Joe Shuster. The series stars Tyler Hoechlin and Elizabeth Tulloch in the title roles, as well as Jordan Elsass, Alex Garfin, Inde Navarrette, Erik Valdez, Emmanuelle Chriqui and Dylan Walsh. The series is set in the Arrowverse, sharing continuity with the other television series of the franchise.

The following is a list of characters who have appeared in the television series. Many are named after (or based on) DC Comics characters.

Overview
Legend
 = Main cast (credited)
 = Recurring cast (4+)
 = Guest cast (1-3)

Main characters

Clark Kent / Superman

Kal-El / Clark Kent / Superman (portrayed by Tyler Hoechlin; seasons 1-present; Dylan Kingwell as a teenage Clark in season one, Josh Zaharia as a teenage Clark in season two, Thomas Hoeving as a child, Parker Cousineau during his grade school years, Lennix James as a 4-year-old Clark) is a superhero from Krypton who defends Earth and is Lois' husband. 

In season one after losing his job at the Daily Planet and his mother dying of a stroke, Clark relocates the family to Smallville for a fresh start and becomes the assistant football coach in Smallville High School. Hoechlin previously portrayed Clark in a recurring role in Supergirl, where the character was introduced, before appearing in guest roles in Arrow, The Flash, Legends of Tomorrow, and Batwoman.

In season two, Clark starts to have strange visions and butts heads with Lt. Mitch Anderson. A scan by Lara Lor-Van's A.I. at Tal-Rho's lair reveals that they are being caused by an "invasive cosmological event". This would lead to an encounter with Bizarro and a fight against Ally Allston. Following the defeat against Ally Allston and her Bizarro counterpart, Superman builds a new Fortress of Solitude in the ocean for his family.

In season three, Clark works to train Jordan in using his powers. In addition, he also goes to work for Chrissy.

 Hoechlin also portrays an evil version of Superman from another Earth. His history in the canon Arrowverse comic mini-series Earth-Prime #2 revealed that his Jonathan and Martha died in a car accident and he was put in a terrible foster home. After unknowing using his powers on the foster father, Clark fled until he was caught by the government who kept him in their custody until the day he escaped. Clark made his way to the Fortress of Solitude where he met the A.I. of his world's Jor-El. After getting training for his abilities, Clark became Superman and used his powers. After being delusioned that the entire world will still be in danger no matter how many times he averts danger, Superman met Tal-Rho who persuaded him to remake Earth into the new Kryton which led to different attacks with Kryptonian-powered people where he killed his world's Lois Lane and Sam Lane and became an opponent to John Henry Irons. While pursuing him into space where John flew into the energy wave during the Crisis on Infinite Earths, Superman was saved by Magog who offered to pair him up against Earth-Prime's Superman.

Bizarro

Bizarro (portrayed by Tyler Hoechlin; season 2; performed by Daniel Cudmore in full-armored form) is a deformed version of Superman from Bizarro World who sports a tattered cape and a backwards version of the Superman logo while sporting opposite abilities. His fame and the development of his son Jon-El's powers go over his head putting a strain on his family. When it came to the rise of his world's Ally Allston, Bizarro's relationship with his Tal-Rho is strained. After getting deformed, Bizarro informs Lois and Sam of his mission to go after the other Ally Allston before they can merge. He was first seen in a full-armored form in the Shuster Mine. His attack in the Shuster Mine attracted the attention of Dr. Faulkner and her as-yet-unidentified superior. When it was freed, Bizarro went on the attack on the soldiers there until it engaged Superman and John Henry Irons. While John was able to break part of the helmet to show it's face, Bizarro only retreated when he suffered from the same painful visions that Superman had. In the arctic, Bizarro sheds his armor. Bizarro attacks Superman again where his special necklace starts to siphon some energy from him. John barely manages to help repel him. The Supermen of America track down the figure at Salar de Uyuni as Superman senses him killing the two unnamed members. Superman arrives to fight him while Tag escapes with the necklace. The figure is repelled at the cost of John getting hospitalized. Superman later fights Bizarro again after he kills Dr. Faulkner and nearly kills Ally Alston. With help from Lara's A.I., Superman was able to translate Bizarro's language where he learns that Ally will bring ruin to his world after she had conquered his world. After Superman and Lois escaped from Mitch Anderson's custody, Tal-Rho learned from Bizarro that his Bizarro counterpart was inseparable from him until Tal-Rho's wife nearly killed him. When Anderson attacks while wielding Project 7334 weapons and X-Kryptonite, Lara's A.I. released Bizarro to help fight Anderson. Bizarro was overpowered by Anderson who used X-Kryptonite grenades on him and strangled Bizarro to death. Both the Bizarro version of Lara's A.I. and the Bizarro version of the Kents learned of what happened from both Superman and Anderson.

Lois Lane

Lois Lane (portrayed by Elizabeth Tulloch; seasons 1-present) is a renowned journalist and Clark's wife.

In season one, Lois quits her job after Morgan Edge buys the Daily Planet and start working at a local publication Smallville Gazette.

In season two, Lois and Chrissy start to work on expanding their staff. Due to some sources recanting the stories written by Lois, she and Chrissy work to prove them starting with one that Lois was told about by her sister Lucy and her encounter with cult leader Ally Alston. Thanks to Sam, Lois works to speak with Lucy only to end up confronted by Ally Alston who claimed that Lucy sent her in her place. Following Ally Allston's defeat, Lois reveals to Chrissy that Clark is Superman and has a brief chat with Ally and her Bizarro counterpart.

In season three, Lois visits Dr. Irons about what she knows about what this Earth's version of John Henry Irons did that involved Bruno Mannheim. Later on, Dr. Irons asks Lois to come in to do some more tests.

 Tulloch also portrays a variation of Lois Lane from another Earth where she is married to John Henry Irons. Before being killed by Superman, she gives away the Kryptonite weakness in her news report and tells her family that she loves them.
 Tullock also portrays Lois' Bizarro counterpart whose relationship with Bizarro was strained. She works with Sam and Jordan in a resistance against her world's Ally Allston. Bizarro Lois later watches Allston's broadcast where she plans to merge both worlds.

Jonathan Kent

Jonathan Kent (portrayed by Jordan Elsass; seasons 1-2; Michael Bishop; season 3; Brady Droulis as a 7-year-old) is the modest and kind-hearted son of Clark and Lois although unlike his twin brother Jordan, Jonathan doesn't seem to have inherited any of Clark's kryptonian powers even though he is a top level athlete by human standards. 

In season 1 although Jonathan initially claims that he isn't bothered by the fact that he unfortunately didn't get superpowers like Jordan and even supports his brother on his journey to master his new abilities, he does admit later on that a part of him is actually jealous of his twin brother's new powers since thanks to them Jordan becomes very popular at their new high school and Smallville High's best new football player, but doesn't let his jealousy destroy his relationship with his brother and they both still love each other very much. Jonathan's insecurities comes to ahead later in season 1 after Jonathan and Jordan find out about how Morgan Edge and John Henry Irons are threatening both Smallville and their parent's lives. Jonathan feels powerless and defenseless compared to his father and brother's powers which leads him to take some of Irons' weapons until he returns them in the season 1 finale. He is named after Clark's adoptive father Jonathan Kent. Jonathan is on the Smallville high school football team called the Smallville Crows, but gets kicked off of the team after he tries to get rid of his girlfriend's illegal drugs and takes the fall for her in season 2.

In season two, Jonathan starts dating Candice Pergande and finds out that she was the one who sold X-Kryptonite crystals to Timmy Ryan, and confronts her about it. Instead of telling on her, Jonathan asks for a crystal, which enhances his strength and vision. After getting caught by Principal Balcomb and the Smallville Sheriff Department trying to dispose of Candice's supply, he was unable to admit to Lois that they were Candice's. After a fight with a crazed Mitch Anderson, Clark returns and is informed of what happened, telling Jonathan to start apologizing to Principal Balcomb, Coach Gaines, and the Smallville Crows. Clark persuades Principal Balcomb to allow Jonathan to do an online education as Jonathan will also be working at Brit and Dunn's. After a fire at a warehouse containing X-Kryptonite, Sam persuades Jonathan to come clean as he advises them to keep the identity of the person private from the press. He calls Candice to the farm as she informs them on what she knows. Following Ally Allston's defeat, Jonathan and Jordan receive trucks that were delivered to them by "Uncle Tal".

In season three, Jonathan gets his driver's license and celebrates his 16th birthday.

 Jordan Elsass also portrays Jon-El Jonathan's Bizarro counterpart, who has powers. With his relationship with his father is strained, Jon-El is swayed to the side of his world's Ally Allston. When both versions of Ally Allston start to merge, Jon-El is instruced to merge with his counterpart as Superman goes after him. He appears to inform Lois and Jordan that Superman lost. After attempt to merge with Jonathan failed, Jon-El kidnaps Lana, luring Superman into a Kryptonite-based trap and summons Lana-Rho. When he goes after Jonathan again, Jordan managed to defeat them in mid-air. Jon-El was remanded to DOD custody where Superman tries to get an imprisoned Jon-El to turn against Ally Allston to no avail. Lana-Rho later sprung him from his imprisonment where they attacked a weakened Superman at Smallville High School. They were defeated by Jordan and Natalie.

Jordan Kent 
Jordan Kent (portrayed by Alex Garfin; seasons 1-present; Dawson Littman as a 7-year-old) is the introspective son of Clark and Lois. He has social anxiety and enjoys playing video games alone. He has inherited his father's powers, though initially his abilities are only in 'small bursts'; Jordan's powers being much weaker than a full kryptonians and originally had trouble using some of them on command like his heat vision, but did still develop other powers such as super hearing and freeze breath. He is named after Clark's biological father Jor-El. Jordan later joins Smallville high school football team although he later quits in order to focus on helping his family deal with Tal-Rho.

In season two, Jordan's powers have matured and started to grow at a tremendous rate with him able to now use his abilities much more easily. After Superman begins to have painful visions that debilitate him while in the field, Jordan plans to find a way to help his dad. Sam agrees to secretly train him in order for Jordan to become more adept at using his powers, during which at some point Jordan gains his super speed. Lois finds out that Jordan withheld information on Jonathan taking X-Kryptonite. After Jordan secretly helps save Kyle from a fire by super leaping through a wall that John Henry Irons witnesses, Lois confronted Jordan about it and learned that Sam trained him. She forbade Jordan to follow in his father's footsteps until Lois and Sam were caught outside an X-Kryptonite distribution house. Lois was forced to call for Jordan's help when she realized that without him they would've been killed and witnessed him effortlessly defeat their captors after he gained his ability of accelerated perception and save them thanks to his newfound handle on his powers. When it came to the fight against Ally Allston's followers, he struggled in his fight against Jon-El (who had been sent to merge with Jonathan), but manages to defeat him while in the air when Jordan flies for the first time. After Jon-El's defeat Jordan also gets taught by Clark on how to fly and even learns how to fly in space, but still doesn't know how to land yet. When Lana-Rho springs Jon-El from his imprisonment and they attacked Superman, Jordan and Natalie defeat them. During the fight against Ally Allston, Jordan went to rescue Tal-Rho from being slain by Ally. After Ally is defeated, Jonathan and Jordan receive trucks that were delivered to them by "Uncle Tal".

In season three, Jordan celebrates his 16th birthday while being trained by his father in using his abilities. Unlike Jonathan, Jordan doesn't try to bother getting his drivers license due to returning his own truck since he could already fly and run at super speed.

 Alex Garfin also portrays Jordan's Bizarro counterpart who doesn't have powers. He helps his mother and grandfather in a small resistance against his world's Ally Allston. Bizarro Jordan later watches Allston's broadcast where she plans to merge both worlds.

Kyle Cushing 
Kyle Cushing (portrayed by Erik Valdez; seasons 1-present) is Lana's ex-husband and the father of Sarah and Sophie. He is Smallville's fire chief.

In season two, Kyle supports Lana's campaign to become the next Mayor of Smallville after the original candidate Daniel Hart dropped out. His previous affair with Tonya Martinz was found out by Sarah which partially affects her quinceañera. While Lana forgave him, Kyle was advised to move out. At Aubrey's advice, Sarah visits Kyle outside the liquor store. Kyle later helps Lana rehearse for the debate on family values against Mayor Dean. While fighting a fire at a warehouse that contained X-Kryptonite, Kyle was injured by a fire tornado and was secretly rescued by Jordan. As Ally Allston started to merge Earth-Prime and Bizarro World, Kyle suddenly disappeared. This landed him on Bizarro World where Lois states that what happened recently was not his fault. After Ally was defeated, Kyle and Lana reconciled but Lana told him that although they will always be in each others lives, things between them could never go back to how they were and that Kyle had to stop holding out hope that they would get back together.

In season three, Kyle and Lana have gotten a divorce and he later finds himself sleeping with Chrissy.

Sarah Cortez 
Sarah Cortez (portrayed by Inde Navarrette; seasons 1-present) is Kyle and Lana's oldest daughter.

In season two, Sarah returned from camp and starts acting awkward around Jordan. She later revealed to him that she kissed a fellow camper named Aubrey for some unknown reason. At the advice of her mother, Sarah and Jordan work out this issue. There was even a mentioning that Sarah had an earlier suicide attempt at some point in her life. During her quinceañera, Sarah and Jordan overheard the discussion between Kyle and Sarah which Lana plans to settle at a later point. Sarah later invites Aubrey to the local diner to talk about the issues with her family right now. Aubrey advises Sarah to talk with her father. When her mom wins the election, Sarah was saddened that Jordan wasn't present when the victory was announced and breaks up with him. Jordan tries to find ways to explain himself to Sarah. At the time when Ally Allston started to merge Earth-Prime and Bizarro World, Sarah witnessed Jordan using his powers on Lana-Rho and later confronted her mom about this. Their argument was interrupted when Sophie informed them that their father disappeared. After Ally was defeated, Sarah learns the truth about Jordan's abilities and that his father Clark Kent is Superman.

In season three, Sarah sports a new hairstyle and agrees with Jordan that they should stay separated.

John Henry Irons

John Henry Irons (portrayed by Wolé Parks; seasons 1-present) is a mysterious and solo survivor from an unidentified parallel Earth. Introduced under the alias of "Captain Luthor", this version is from an unidentified alternate Earth that was ravaged by an army of evil Kryptonians, engineered by his Earth's Morgan Edge and led by Superman. Additionally, he was married to his Earth's Lois Lane and had a daughter named Natalie. After Lois exposed the Kryptonians' weakness to Kryptonite on the news, she was killed by Superman. In response, John and Nat built a suit of armor and incorporated an A.I. named Hedy he took from his Earth's Lex Luthor. As he was unable to reprogram its recognition protocols, John was forced to go by "Captain Luthor". At some point prior to his Earth's destruction, John makes his way to Earth-Prime and witnesses its Superman. 

Convinced he will inevitably turn evil, John hunts down Earth-Prime Superman. Along the way, he encounters Earth-Prime's Lois, introduces himself as "Marcus Bridgewater", and offers to help her investigate Morgan, leading to them finding X-Kryptonite. After finishing his hammer, John uses Lois to arrange a meeting with Superman and beats him after weakening him with red solar flares. Upon having Lt. Reno Rosetti run the prints on the box he gave them to see if he was related to Lex Luthor, she learned that "Marcus" is a variation of John Henry Irons. Meanwhile, having obtained John's fingerprints to see if he was related to Luthor, Lois deduces John's identity and joins forces with her sons, Jonathan and Jordan, to save Superman while the Department of Defense take John into their custody. While being interrogated by Superman, John briefly reminisces on his past and how he got to Earth-Prime before warning Superman that Earth-Prime will go through what his Earth did. However, Lois convinces John that her Superman is nothing like the ones from his Earth. John later helps Superman in his fight against Tal-Rho. Afterwards, John is surprised by the arrival of Natalie.

In season two, John works to help Natalie adjust to Earth-Prime when they are in Metropolis. When this fails and she has a talk with Natalie, Lois allows them to move in with them. John even helps her in measuring the tremors at the Shuster Mine. He was present when Clark tells Lois about his visions being tied to an "invasive cosmological event". Following a fight with Bizarro, John receives help from Natalie on repairing the armor. When it comes to the next fight with Bizarro, John was beaten up enough to end up in the hospital's ICU. After getting out, Clark was able to have John and Natalie move into a house that was owned by an old friend of his. When Superman entered the Inverse World, John had to cover for him and even joined Natalie in honoring the memory of their Lois. John later found out that Natalie had made her own super-suit and couldn't destroy it due to being coated in a lacquer made from X-Kryptonite. He does allow her to help him when it comes to Superman's fight with Ally Allston in Burnham Woods. After Natalie uses the X-Kryptonite lacquer on his armor, John later fights Ally in the portal between Earth-Prime and Bizarro World only to be knocked unconscious by her powers. Natalie rescued him despite the buggy message to bring X-Kryptonite. Both of them were rescued by Superman before Ally can harm them. After Superman defeated Ally, she and her Bizarro counterpart were handed over to John and Natalie. Sometime later, John was approached by John Diggle who was looking for answers on why this Earth's John Henry Irons was killed by Bruno Mannheim.

In season three, John joins the DOD. He does reprimand Sam Lane when he hears that he tried to get Natalie in joining the DOD's academy. When ex-mayor George Dean confronts Lana on some reallocated funds, John orders George to take his leave.

 Parks' image was also used to portray the John Henry Irons from Superman and Lois' Earth who is mentioned to have been killed in action. The season two finale revealed that this John was killed by Bruno Mannheim during the discussion above. He is also revealed to have a sister named Dr. Irons and was said to have sold some weapons to Bruno Mannheim.

Morgan Edge / Tal-Rho

Morgan Edge (portrayed by Adam Rayner; main: season 1; recurring: season 2; Jack Rehbein as a 10-year-old, Ben Cockell as a 19-year-old Tal-Rho) is an intelligent, eloquent and impassioned self-made mogul" and CEO of Edge EnerCorp who has taken an interest in Smallville, raising suspicion from Lois. In Smallville, Edge's company Edge EnerCorp gains ownership of a mine that contains X-Kryptonite which he plans to use to continue experiments in an attempt to create a superpowered army. His previous experiments resulted in only one non-flawed subject, his assistant Leslie Larr. His work in Smallville brings him into further conflict with Lois Lane and an alternate John Henry Irons, who comes from an Earth where a similar army led by Superman ravaged Metropolis and murdered John's wife, Lois. Edge is later revealed to be a Kryptonian named Tal-Rho, the son of Lara Lor-Van and Zeta-Rho and thus Superman's maternal half-brother. 

His escape pod landed in England, where he immediately came into conflict with the local townspeople. He was captured and experimented on before managing to escape, causing him to hate mankind. His goal is to resurrect Krypton on Earth by implanting Kryptonian consciousnesses into human hosts using the X-Kryptonite and the Eradicator. Upon finding Superman's body at the Fortress of Solitude following the defeat of most of the Subjekts, Tal-Rho uses Kryptonian technology to review Superman's memories, discovering his human family. With his family threatened, Superman agrees to accompany Tal-Rho to his hideout where the A.I. of Zeta-Rho instructs Tal-Rho to use the Eradicator on him. After the attempt is thwarted during a fight with John, Tal-Rho is defeated with the Eradicator not being found and is placed in a Kryptonite cell. What nobody knows is that Tal-Rho had somehow become fused with the Eradicator which enables him to overcome the Kryptonite and begin his next plot that involved placing a copy of Zeta-Rho into Jordan. Superman and John were able to defeat Tal-Rho and remove Zeta-Rho from Jordan. Tal-Rho and Leslie are placed in DOD custody.

In season two, Tal-Rho is kept in a special cell that has red solar lights. Superman visited him to see if there were side-effects to the Eradicator conscious due to the painful visions he has. Tal-Rho mentioned that he hasn't experienced them while also claiming that he lost his powers in the solar flare that Irons caused. When the vision happen again following a hostage crisis caused by Phillip Karnowski, Superman gives in to Tal-Rho's deal to make use of his lair as Jordan comes with Superman to keep an eye on Tal-Rho. As Tal-Rho activates the A.I. copy of Lara as she scans Superman, he starts to have the visions again as Jordan learns that Tal-Rho faked losing his powers. After a brief scuffle between Superman and Tal-Rho, Lara tells Superman that his visions are the result of an "invasive cosmological event" and tells Tal-Rho that there might be some good in him. Tal-Rho is later returned to his cell. When Superman ends up locked in Tal-Rho's cell by Anderson, Tal-Rho is tortured so that Superman can get Anderson the location of Bizarro. Thanks to a later tactic from Bizarro, Superman and Tal-Rho escape from their cell as Superman follows Tal-Rho to his fortress. With Lara's A.I. translating, Tal-Rho learned that his Bizarro counterpart was inseparable from Bizarro until Bizarro Tal-Rho's wife tried to kill him. Before Tal-Rho can ask who his wife was, they were attacked by Anderson who was powered with Project 7334 weapons and X-Kryptonite. When Anderson fired a Kryptonite gun at Superman, Tal-Rho jumped in front of him. As Anderson fights Bizarro, Superman had to use his heat vision on the Kryptonite shards and fly Tal-Rho to the sun. Back in his cell, Tal-Rho is informed by Superman that Bizarro is dead and Anderson is at large. Before Superman departs, Tal-Rho has him forward his apology to Jordan. Superman later had Tal-Rho released so that he can help destroy Ally Allston's pendant. Though he had to get Lois' apology first. During this plan in an active volcano, Superman and Tal-Rho were ambushed by Ally Allston. With help from John, Superman and Tal-Rho fended off Ally and destroyed the pendant. Once that was done, Superman found that a weakened Tal-Rho managed to sneak away. Tal-Rho later returned to help Superman regain his powers so that he can defeat Ally Allston. Once Ally was defeated, Tal-Rho used his "Uncle Tal" alias to send Jonathan and Jordan two trucks. Then he went to Bizarro World to start life anew as he starts to learn from a bartender on who his wife was.

 Adam Rayner also portrays Tal-Rho's Bizarro counterpart who was on good terms with Bizarro and was named by a magazine to be an eligible bachelor. In addition, he is married to his world's Lana Lang. Tal-Rho's relationship with his brother was strained due to a disagreement about their world's Ally Allston. He and Lana later accompanied both versions of Ally Allston in claiming the pendant from Superman and Mitch Anderson. After Anderson was killed by Jon-El and both versions of Ally Allston start to merge while sending Jon-El to merge with  his counterpart, Tal-Rho blows down Lana and allows Superman to go after Jon-El. While imprisoned for this action, Ally Allston visited Tal-Rho's cell. When he asks to see his wife, Ally states that she won't see him anymore as she drains his lifeforce from his body.

Sam Lane

Sam Lane (portrayed by Dylan Walsh; seasons 1-present) is Lois Lane's father, Jonathan and Jordan's grandfather, and an Army general who is determined to keep America and the world safe from all threats. Following the fight against Tal-Rho, Sam tells John Henry Irons that he is planning on retiring from active duty.

In season two, Sam Lane is called to the Kent farm by Lois when Superman starts suffering from visions caused by an "invasive cosmological event". While advising Superman to settle his difference with Mitch Anderson, Sam uses his connections to help get John access to the Shuster Mine and was hesitant to help Lois get through to Lucy. He does come through for her. Sam later scrambles the security footage in the Oyelowo family store after Jordan secretly uses his freezing breath to stop some possible shoplifters. He does agree to train Jordan in secret. Sam later found out that Mitch Anderson has arrested Superman for treason. After Anderson stole Project 7334 weapons and X-Krptonite as well as killing Bizarro, Sam informs Lois and Clark that he has talked General Hardcastle into letting him lead the manhunt for Anderson as it turned out that Sam had recommended him as his successor. After Ally was apprehended, Sam was visited by Lucy who secretly spiked his drink so that she can claim his DOD access card and have Ally travel to meet her counterpart. Lois later learns that Sam was training Jordan at the time an investigation at a burnt-down warehouse containing X-Kryptonite was conducted. After Jonathan comes clean about Candice being associated with the X-Kryptonite distribution and her father being broke, Sam agreed with Jonathan to keep her anonymouse. At the location of an X-Kryptonite distribution area, Sam and Lois were captured by a criminal powered by X-Kryptonite causing Lois to allow Jordan to fight them. When Sam and Lois find Lucy with the remaining followers of Ally Allston, he had to briefly handcuff himself to Lucy in order to get Lucy to hear them out. Upon Allston's arrival, she badly weakened Sam in order to draw Superman to her. After Allston got away, Lucy stayed by Sam's side at the DOD's infirmary where he forgave her. After recovering and having a brief trip to Bizarro World, Sam was able to help Lucy relocate to Metropolis following Ally's defeat.

In season three, Sam rejoins the DOD. He tries to get Natalie to enroll in a DOD-sponsored academy which led to him getting reprimanded by John. Sam later apologizes to Natalie during Jonathan and Jordan's birthday party.

 Dylan Walsh also portrays a version of Sam Lane from John Henry Irons' Earth who was killed in conflict against his world's version of Superman.
 Dylan Walsh also portrays Sam Lane' Bizarro counterpart. He was the head of the DEO before his world's version of Ally Allston rose to power and later assisted his Lois and Jordan in a small resistance against Allston.  Bizarro Sam later watched Allston's broadcast where she plans to merge both worlds.

Lana Lang

Lana Lang (portrayed by Emmanuelle Chriqui; seasons 1-present; Milana Hryschenko as a child, Sara Rizk when in grade school, Emma Newton as a teenager) is an old friend of Clark and the loan officer at Smallville Bank. She is married to Kyle and the mother of Sophie and Sarah. In addition, she is also the cheerleader coach at Smallville High School. Due to what Tal-Rho did in Smallville causing the civilians to blame her and Kyle, Lana becomes appalled when she overhears Mayor George Dean talking negative things about them. Lana and Kyle are later forgiven by the citizens of Smallville following Tal-Rho's defeat.

In season two, Lana becomes the campaign manager of Daniel Hart during the mayoral election against Mayor George Dean. She hits a snag in the campaign when Daniel drops out due to having been offered a job in another town. While looking for another candidate, Kyle tells Lana that his fellow firefighters support the idea that she should run for Mayor of Smallville. Lana agrees with him on that. As she works on her campaign, Lana hears about Sarah's camp experience and gives her some advice to work it out with Jordan. During Sarah's quinceañera, Lana finds out about Sarah overhearing Kyle's discussion with Tonya Martinez which she states will be settled on another day. After getting some information from Tonya, Lana forgives Kyle. Though she advises him to move out for a while. After a talk with Lois, Lana crashes Mayor Dean's latest campaign and persuades those in attendance not to fall for the family affair thing. Lana gets assistance from Kyle on the rehearsal of her "family values" debate against Mayor Dean. On the day of the election, Lana defends Jonathan from Barb Dodge's negative comments and sends those involved in her campaign to obtain some voters. When the results were in, Lana was told by Emily Phan that she has won the election. While moving in her stuff to Smallville City Hall, Lana is abducted by Jon-El and used as bait to lure Superman into a Kryptonite trap. While summoning Bizarro Lana to come to Earth, Jon-El goes after Jonathan as Lana works to remove the Kryptnite shards from Superman. Following Jon-El's defeat and with the support of his family, Clark reveals that he is Superman to Lana. This briefly put a strain on her friendship with Clark and Lois. After being informed about Lana-Rho by Clark and Lois, Lana advises them not to interact with her or her family for a while. At the time when Ally Allston was merging Earth-Prime and Bizarro World, Lana held a town meeting at Smallville High School to tell them the truth. George Dean led the townspeople into not believing her until Superman confirmed her case. While getting Sarah, she got a glimpse at Lana-Rho before Jordan fought her and revealed his powers to Sarah. Sarah later argued with her mother about withholding this information until Sophie informed them that their father disappeared. After Ally Allston was defeated, Lana held a celebration to thank Superman and reconciled with Kyle, but decided in the end not to get back together with him.

In season three, Lana and Kyle have gotten a divorce. Principal Balcomb informs Lana about the mold in the school which Clark confirms to her. When George Dean shows up at Jonathan and Jordan's birthday party to get her to return the funds she reallocated, John Henry Irons came to her defense as George leaves stating that she doesn't know what she is getting herself into.

 Emmanuelle Chriqui also portrays a Bizarro version of Lana Lang called Lana-Rho who defends Ally Allston from Bizarro. This version was a former waitress before she married her world's version of Tal-Rho and later gained superpowers. She and Tal-Rho accompanied both versions of Ally Allston in reclaiming the pendant from Superman and Anderson. After both versions of Ally start to merge and Jon-El is sent to merge with his counterpart, Lana was blown down by Tal-Rho so that Superman can go after Jon-El. At the time when Jon-El had abducted Lana, he called Bizarro Lana to Earth. She arrived and ended up fighting John Henry Irons and Natalie. Bizarro Lana beat up John before Natalie stabbed her with X-Kryptonite causing Bizarro Lana to fall back to her world. After weakening Superman, Allston begins to merge both worlds while sending Lana-Rho to finish off Superman. She and Jon-El were defeated by Jordan and Natalie Irons.

Chrissy Beppo
Chrissy Beppo (portrayed by Sofia Hasmik; main: seasons 2-present; recurring: season 1) is a journalist and proprietor of the Smallville Gazette who Lois works with. By the end of season one, Lois buys half of the Smallville Gazette to keep it from being sold to someone else.

In season two, Chrissy looks for recruits for the Smallville Gazette as Lois is displeased with some of her choices. Due to a podcast causing some of Lois' sources to recant the stories she published like the one on cult leader Ally Alston, Chrissy is persuaded by Lois that they have to prove one of them by looking for Lois' sister Lucy. At Ally Allston's event in New Carthage, Chrissy infiltrates it under the alias of Penelope Collins. Ally sees through Chrissy's disguise and plays the live footage of Lois and Lucy's argument which puts a strain on Lois and Chrissy's friendship. After being fed drugged tea by Ally during a talk with her, Chrissy was put through the Inverse Method where she saw her Bizarro counterpart. She later mentioned to Lois about her counterpart being afraid of her father and Ally having supposedly taken over the United States of America on that world. After Ally was defeated, Chrissy learns from Lois that Clark is Superman.

In season three, Chrissy gains Clark as a new employee and finds herself sleeping with Kyle.

 Sofia Hasmik also portrays Chrissy's Bizarro counterpart. While operating the Smallville Gazette with her staff, Mitch Anderson shows up and arranges for her to silently get a message to Lois for her. Chrissy was able to secretly get the message to her.

Natalie Lane Irons

Natalie Lane Irons (portrayed by Tayler Buck; main: seasons 2-present; guest: season 1) is the daughter of the alternate John Henry Irons and Lois Lane from an unidentified parallel Earth. She helped her father to work on his armor when facing the alternate Superman and an army of Kryptonians. When the Crisis hit, Natalie was put under a hibernation by the A.I. Hedy until it can locate the Earth where her father is on. By the end of season one, a vessel carrying Natalie arrives on Earth-Prime. As Natalie reunites with her dad, she sees Lois and mistakes her for her mother.

In season two, Natalie works to adjust to Earth-Prime when operating in Metropolis where she can't interact with Earth-Prime's version of her friends. This became rocky enough that John had to persuade Lois to speak to Natalie. This leads to the Irons family moving in with the Kent family. She later befriends Sarah Cushing and helps her with the car that Sarah and Kyle were working on. While having noticed that her father is still make use of the armor, Natalie agrees to help John in repairing it. On the day when Lana became the new Mayor of Smallvile, Natalie started honoring the memory of her mother as John later joins her in it. Natalie later starts working on her version of her father's armor. John later found out about the armor and tried to destroy it to no avail as Hedy reveals that Natalie had coated it in a lacquer made from X-Kryptonite. After her father was defeated by Ally, Natalie rescued him despite the buggy message to bring X-Kryptonite. Both of them were rescued by Superman before Ally can harm them. After Superman defeated Ally, she and her Bizarro counterpart were handed over to John and Natalie.

In season three, Sam invites Natalie to a movie where he also tries to get her to enroll in a DOD-sponsored academy. This didn't go well and Sam was reprimanded by John. During Jonathan and Jordan's birthday party, Sam apologized to Natalie.

Bruno Mannheim

Bruno Mannheim (portrayed by Chad L. Coleman) is the leader of Intergang who has used tactics to avoid arrest.

He is first seen when he has his scientists experiment on the corpse of Atom Man after his hooded robed minion snatched it after diverting Superman.

Recurring characters

Introduced in season one

Sophie Cushing
Sophie Cushing (portrayed by Joselyn Picard) is the younger daughter of Lana and Kyle and the sister of Sarah. In a discussion between Sarah and Lana, it is mentioned that Sophie picks on some of her classmates.

In season two, Sophie helps out in her mother's mayoral campaign. At the time when Ally Allston started merging Earth-Prime and Bizarro World, Sophie witnesses her father disappear as she tells Lana and Sarah about it.

Leslie Larr
Born Irma Sayres, Leslie Larr (portrayed by Stacey Farber) is a woman with super-strength and heat vision who works as the personal assistant to Morgan Edge. Her abilities come from being experimented on by X-Kryptonite. She assisted her boss in his campaign to make the Earth people the hosts for the Kryptonian consciousness in the Eradicator. Both of them are defeated by Superman and John Henry Irons in the season one finale.

Jor-El

Jor-El (portrayed by Angus Macfadyen) is Clark Kent's biological Kryptonian father. Though he died along with Krypton, a copy of his consciousness is encoded virtually as an AI within the arctic Fortress of Solitude in hologram form to provide guidance when his son seeks help. Before the crystal containing his A.I. was destroyed by Tal-Rho, Jor-El told Superman that he loves him. After Tal-Rho was defeated, Clark buried the broken crystal on the Kent family farm.

Hedy
Hedy (voiced by Daisy Tormé) is an A.I. that works for John Henry Irons and Natalie Irons after it was stolen from his Earth's Lex Luthor.

Sean Smith
Sean Smith (portrayed by Fritzy-Klevans Destine) is a student at Smallville High School and football player on the Smallville Crows. He was Sarah's boyfriend and antagonizes the Kent brothers before she breaks up with him.

Tag Harris
Tag Harris (portrayed by Wern Lee) is a student at Smallville, a friend of Sean Smith, and a member of the Smallville Crows football team who developed vibration abilities upon being exposed to yellow phosphorescence (later revealed to be X-Kryptonite) the day Jordan's heat vision manifested.

In season two, Tag appears as a member of the Supermen of America.

Timmy Ryan
Timmy Ryan (portrayed by Zane Clifford) is a student at Smallville High School who is a friend of Sean Smith and a member of the Smallville Crows football team.

In season two, Timmy Ryan gets stronger as Jonathan suspects that he is using steroids. When Jonathan confronts him on this, Timmy claims that he got a strange crystal that gave him his strength from Candice Pergande. He was later mentioned to have been caught with an inhaler with X-Kryptonite in it.

Reno Rosetti

Lt. Reno Rosetti (portrayed by Hesham Hammoud) is a military lieutenant in the DOD that works for Sam Lane. He later gets empowered by Morgan Edge through X-Kryptonite offscreen and fights Superman in Project 7734's room before being killed by a Kryptonite spear wielded by John Henry Irons.

 Hesham Hammoud also portrays Reno Rosetti's Bizarro counterpart. He was a member of the DOD before siding with his world's version of Ally Allston.

Gaines
Gaines (portrayed by Danny Wattley) is the football coach] at Smallville High School who coaches the Smallvile Crows football team.

 Danny Wattley also portrays Gaines' Bizarro counterpart.

Malcolm Teague
Malcolm Teague (portrayed by Austin Obiajunwa) is a student at Smallville High School who is a member of the Smallville Crows football team.

Cobb Branden
Cobb Branden (portrayed by Dee Jay Jackson) is a farmer who is a friend of the Kent family.

George Dean
George Dean (portrayed by Eric Keenleyside) was the Mayor of Smallville before Lana Lang successfully defeated him in the mayoral election. At the time when Ally Allston was merging Earth with Bizarro World, he attended the town meeting at Smallville High School and was among those who doubted Lana's claim until Superman corroborated her information.

In season three, George Dean arrived at Jonathan and Jordan's birthday party where he tries to get Lana to return to allocated funds. After John Henry Irons orders him to leave, George does that as he states to Lana that she doesn't know what she is getting herself into.

Corey Wellnitz
Corey Wellnitz (portrayed by Pavel Romano) is a student at Smallville High School who is a member of the Smallville Crows football team. His parents own a lake house.

Aidy Manning
Aidy Manning (portrayed by Monique Phillips) is a resident of Smallville.

Tamera Dalley
Tamera Dalley (portrayed by Tori Katonga) is a firefighter that works for the Smallville Fire Department.

Emily Phan
Emily Phan (portrayed by Leeah Wong) is a woman who knows Lana Lang and later undergoes Morgan Edge's X-Kryptonite experiments. After being purified of the Kryptonian conscious, Emily is among the Smallville citizens that blame Lana and Kyle for trusting Morgan Edge. Though she later forgives them following Tal-Rho's defeat.

In season two, Emily Phan gets involved in Lana's campaign to become the new Mayor of Smallville and informs Lana about the word on the street that Mayor George Dean would use some of Sarah's past in his re-election. She later informs Lana that she has won the election.

Introduced in season two

Mitch Anderson

Lieutenant General Mitch Anderson (portrayed by Ian Bohen) is the metaphorical “new sheriff in town” at the DOD. His worldview divides into two types – those you serve and those who serve you. He doesn’t like that Superman exists outside that paradigm and tries to bring the Man of Steel under his authority officially. He starts a superhero group that even includes Tag as one of his recruits as they sport the Superman logo on their chest much to the dismay of Superman. When Superman gives Anderson the information needed to track the Superman look-alike, Anderson ignores his advice not to send the Supermen of America out to confront the figure which resulted in the two-unnamed members getting killed. Due to Superman withholding information and not wanting to give up the pendant Bizarro was wearing as well as having been scolded by General Hardcastle, Mitch has Superman arrested for treason under red solar lights and has him transported to where Tal-Rho is. Thanks to a tactic from Superman and Tal-Rho, Anderson was led into believing that Bizarro was at the Fortress of Solitude. After they escaped, Anderson had a call from General Hardcastle put on hold as takes matters into his own hands. Using some Project 7334 weapons and X-Kryptonite, Anderson tracked Superman and Tal-Rho to Tal-Rho's lair where he attacked them. After Tal-Rho was hit by the Kryptonite gun that was meant for Superman, Lara Lor-Van's A.I. released Bizarro to help fight Anderson. As Superman tended to Tal-Rho, Bizarro fought Anderson who overpowered him with X-Kryptonite grenades and strangled him to death. Following these incidents, General Hardcastle established a manhunt for Anderson who went AWOL. Anderson later approached Ally Allston and gave her the pendant that was on Bizarro. After going through the same procedure as Chrissy, he relays the message to Ally from her Bizarro counterpart to come now. He was able to lead some of Ally's followers through the portal while Superman rescued Chrissy, Ally, and another one of Ally's followers. When he arrived, he was nearly absorbed by his Bizarro counterpart until Jon-El accidentally killed him with his heat breath. Anderson managed to escape and have the Bizarro version of Chrissy arrange a meeting with Lois. Upon learning about Bizarro's family, Anderson starts to regret his actions even when Superman arrives. While also apologizing for his actions toward Superman while seeing that he was right all along, Anderson helps Superman when both versions of Ally Allston and the Bizarro versions of Tal-Rho and Lana Lang arrived. Anderson was killed in battle with Jon-El.

 Bohen also portrays his Bizarro counterpart. He accompanied his world's Ally Allston in meeting the arrivals. When Anderson arrived, Bizarro Anderson tried to merge with him only to be accidentally killed by Jon-El's fire breath.

Candice Pergande
Candice Pergande (portrayed by Samantha Di Francesco) is Jonathan's latest girlfriend. He later found out that he sold a special crystal that gave Timmy Ryan enhanced strength. Jonathan confronted her about and she stated that she needed to make money to keep herself and her father off the streets. Rather than break up with her, Jonathan asks for one of the crystals. When he tries to get rid of the X-Kryptonite at the time when the Sheriff Department arrives, he had to take the blame to protect Candice when one of the dogs detected it. When Jonathan and Candice were threatened by rival X-Kryptonite distributor Mickey Jeroux, they are saved by Jordan. With some persuasion from Sam Lane following a warehouse fire that contained X-Kryptonite, Jonathan brings Candice over who comes clean with her involvement with the X-Kryptonite, her connection with Mickey Jeroux, and her father's financial problems. Sam agreed to Jonathan's suggestion to keep her anonymous to the press.

Ally Allston

Ally Alston (portrayed by Rya Kihlstedt as an adult, Amber Young as a child) is a cult leader investigated by Lois Lane who once affected Lucy Lane. She preaches something known as "The Inverse Method" and has managed to ensnare Lucy during a particularly vulnerable point in her life. Through the Inverse Method, Chrissy saw her other world counterpart as Superman prevents Bizarro from attacking Ally. Superman later learned from Bizarro that Ally took over his world and will do the same thing to Superman's world if she isn't stopped. Ally was later approached by Mitch Anderson who gave her the pendant that was on Bizarro. After putting Anderson through the same procedure she did to Lucy, Ally gets the message from Anderson that her Bizarro counterpart wants her to come now. Superman prevented the departure of Ally, Chrissy, and another member where Ally ends up in DOD custody. Sam tries to get her to divulge any knowledge on where Lucy is. With help from Lucy, Erin Wu freed Ally and gave her the rebuilt armor that Bizarro wore upon his arrival. Superman aided the Bizarro versions of Lois, Jordan, and Sam against Ally, her Bizarro counterpart, and their allies. Ally manages to get a hold of the pendant and combines with her Bizarro counterpart while sending Jon-El to merge with Jonathan. After the pendant was confiscated, Ally appears to fight Superman and Tal-Rho even when John Henry Irons shows up. When Superman and Tal-Rho destroy the pendant, Ally grabs the pieces and flies off. Back in Bizarro World, Ally informs Lana-Rho about what happened. She then visits the cell of her Tal-Rho and drains him off his lifeforce. Afterwards, Ally broadcasts to all of Bizarro World that she is going to merge Earth and Bizarro World. Ally later appears before her remaining followers in Burnham Woods where she drains some energy out of Sam in order to draw Superman to her. When Superman arrives, she badly weakens him before retreating. As she plans to merge Earth and Bizarro World, Ally sends Lana-Rho to finish off Superman. Ally begins to merge Earth-Prime and Bizarro World and manages to defeat John Henry Irons when he tries to interfere. After Superman is recharged by the Sun with help from Tal-Rho, he defeats Ally Allston enough to split her back into two, has them restrained by John and Natalie, and prevents Bizarro World from merging with Earth. Ally and her Bizarro counterpart are shown to have been remanded to DOD custody as Lois briefly visits them.

 Kihlstedt also portrays the Bizarro version of Ally Alston.

Lucy Lane

Lucy Lane (portrayed by Jenna Dewan) is Lois Lane's younger sister who had fallen in with the "Inverse Method" cult five years ago. Lois and Sam had a hard time persuading her that Ally is dangerous, but when Ally weakened Sam and Superman at Burnham Woods, Lucy saw that her family was right about Ally. Lucy stayed by her father's bed at the DOD's infirmary where he forgave her. After Ally was defeated, Lucy moved to Metropolis with her father taking her there.

Dewan previously played a different version of Lucy in Supergirl.

Guest characters

Introduced in season one
 Martha Kent (portrayed by Michele Scarabelli) - The adoptive mother of Clark Kent. She later dies of a stroke in the pilot. A bench was later dedicated in memory of her.
 Jonathan Kent Sr. (portrayed by Fred Henderson) - The adoptive father of Clark Kent. He died of a heart attack while Clark was still a teenager.
 Perry White (portrayed by Paul Jarrett) - The editor-in-chief of the Daily Planet before Morgan Edge bought it out.
 Samuel Foswell (portrayed by Dean Marshall) - A minion of Morgan Edge who runs the Daily Planet after it was bought by Edge.
 Dr. Frye (portrayed by Chy Liu) - Martha Kent's doctor who informs Clark about Martha having a stroke.
 Eliza (portrayed by Coral Humphrey) - Jonathan's girlfriend who he speaks to through a video chat ever since the Kent family relocated to Smallville. She eventually broke up with him.
 David Fuglestad / Subjekt-11 (portrayed by Daniel Cudmore) - A man with super-strength that rivals Superman's super-strength due to having been experimented on with X-Kryptonite by Morgan Edge and Dabney Donovan. After being defeated by Superman, David was later killed by Leslie Larr on Morgan Edge's orders. She calls up Edge to inform him that her job is done and that she'll arrange for a team to dispose of his body.
 Sharon Powell (portrayed by Jill Teed) - A woman whose son was offered a job by Morgan Edge and later gets targeted by Subjekt-11.
 Derek Powell (portrayed by Clayton James) - A miner and Sharon's son who took a job by Morgan Edge. After being killed in an accident, Derek was revived by Morgan and Leslie using X-Kryptonite that gave him Kryptonian abilities. During the fight with Superman, Derek commits suicide by turning the heat vision on himself.
 Tom Mitchel (portrayed by Rohain Arora) - A firefighter that works for the Smallville Fire Department.
 Thaddeus Killgrave (portrayed by Brendan Fletcher) - A mad scientist and old enemy of Superman who works with Intergang.
 Denise Olowe (portrayed by Kelcey Mawema) - A cheerleader at Smallville High School.
 Dabney Donovan (portrayed by Robel Zere) - A scientist and associate of Morgan Edge who assisted in his experiment with X-Kryptonite and the Eradicator.
 Robbie Alvarez (portrayed by Stephen Adekolu) - A firefighter that works for the Smallville Fire Department.
 Tegan Wickhem (portrayed by Kayla Heller) - A student at Smallville High School who becomes Jonathan's love interest. She and her mother moved to Smallville from Central City after her father was arrested and incarcerated.
 Dr. Wiles (portrayed by Wendy Crewson) - A Department of Defense (DOD) therapist whom Lois sees.
 Jason Trask (portrayed by Spencer Lang) - A lieutenant in the DOD who was supposed to torture John Henry Irons before being killed by Lt. Rosetti.
 Duc Phan (portrayed by Jay Zhang) - The husband of Emily Phan.
 Avery Phan (portrayed by Kenendy Chew) - The daughter of Emily and Duc Phan.
 Ms. Sharp (portrayed by Marika Siewert) - A music teacher at Smallville High School.
 Jasper Townes (portrayed by Shawn Stewart) - A man who undergoes Morgan Edge's X-Kryptonite experiments.
 Ron Troupe (portrayed by Charles Jarman) - A reporter from the Daily Planet during Clark's early days.
 Janet (portrayed by Yoshi Bancroft) - A television producer from the Daily Planet during Clark's early days.
 Yoshi Bancroft also portrays Janet's Bizarro counterpart.
 Henry Miller / Atom Man (portrayed by Paul Lazenby) - A Neo-Nazi arsonist whom Clark fought in his early days. In season three, Atom Man is shown attacking Metropolis where Superman finds that he has superpowers. Before being supposedly shot and having his corpse snatched away by a mysterious figure, Atom Man mentions that he is dying and some people are after him. Superman would later learn that Atom Man was dying from a tumor. While underground, Bruno Mannheim has his scientist inject something into Atom Man's corpse. The life support system that Atom Man is hooked up to starts beeping.
 Dr. Patel (portrayed by Yasmin Abidi) - The doctor who delivered Clark and Lois' sons.
 Zeta-Rho (portrayed by A. C. Peterson) - The father of Tal-Rho and ex-husband of Lara Lor-Van. Like Jor-El, a copy of his consciousness is encoded virtually as an A.I. within Tal-Rho's desert hideout in hologram form.
 John Diggle (portrayed by David Ramsay) - An A.R.G.U.S. operative from Star City. John Diggle arrived in Smallville with some A.R.G.U.S. equipment upon Sam Lane contacting Lyla Michaels. After a talk with Lois, Diggle scolds Sam for plotting to use the A.R.G.U.S. technology to take out Superman due to Tal-Rho planning to subject him to the Eradicator. When he finds out that John Henry Irons is from another Earth, Diggle states to Sam that they will have a talk about this later. Later on, Diggle mentioned to Sam that he left the life of dealing with the deaths of people he knew and encounter characters from other Earths. A few months later following Ally Allston's defeat, Diggle visits John Henry Irons to find out why Bruno Mannheim killed this Earth's Irons.

Ramsay previously played a different version of Diggle in the Arrowverse.

Introduced in season two
 Daniel Hart (portrayed by Nathan Witte) - A man who runs against Mayor George Dean in the mayoral election. Lana Lang becomes his campaign manager. He drops out of the election when he gets offered a job in another town.
 Jessie Vance (portrayed by Evelyn Gonda) - A woman who is a member of the Supermen of America. She and her unnamed teammate were killed by Bizarro.
 Lara Lor-Van (portrayed by Mariana Klaveno) - The mother of Superman through Jor-El and Tal-Rho through Zeta-Rho. Like Jor-El and Zeta-Rho, a copy of her consciousness is encoded virtually as an A.I. within Tal-Rho's desert hideout in hologram form. While pleased to see her sons and displeased with Zeta-Rho's manipulation of Tal-Rho, Lara scans Superman to find the source of his visions. After Superman's latest vision and his brief fight with Tal-Rho, Lara reveals to Superman that his visions are tied to an "invasive cosmological event" and states to Tal-Rho that there might be some good in him. Her revelation lead to the arrival of Bizarro. In season three, Lara's A.I. is placed in the Kent family's Fortress of Solitude.
 Mariana Klaveno portrays the Bizarro version of Lara Lor-Van's A.I. who learns the fate of her son from Superman before being turned off by Jon-El.
 Dr. Kit Faulkner (portrayed by Catherine Lough Haggquist) - A geologist working for AmerTek Industries that oversees the mining operation at the Shuster Mine in Smallville. After a monstrous figure was seen in the mines that causes a miner to detonate the tunnel, Faulkner calls up an unknown person about it. At the time when John Henry Irons gets access thanks to Sam Lane's contact, Dr. Faulkner knocks him out when he finds detonated rocks. Kit was later revealed to have connections with Ally Allston and was later killed by Bizarro.
 Phillip Karnowski (portrayed by Shaw Madson) - An arms dealer and drug dealer that got his hands on some X-Kryptonite. While holding a pilot and those with him hostage, Superman arrived to fight as Karnowski breathed in some X-Kryptonite to fight Superman. When Superman started to have the painful visions, Karnowski was defeated by the Supermen of America.
 Chuck Arden' (portrayed by Tony Hargrave) - A resident of Smallville who Lana once sold a small business loan to which didn't turn out to be legit. He brought up Lana's dealings in Smallville during one of her mayoral campaign activities.
 Tonya Martinez (portrayed by Cynthia Mendez) - A bartender at a Smallville bar called Monito's who Kyle once had an affair with. When Kyle took Sarah to Monito's for open mic night, it was mentioned by Kyle that Tonya no longer works there. Though she was able to carry a favor from Kyle to the bar's manager.
 Erin Wu (portrayed by Stephanie Cho) - A U.S. Army member with the rank of First Sergeant who works under Mitch Anderson. She later helps to free Ally Allston from DOD custody and give her the rebuilt armor that Bizarro wore upon his arrival on Earth.
 John Pugh (portrayed by Jim Thorburn) - An attorney that was associated with Ally Allston's family.
 David (portrayed by Matthew Graham) - The uncle of Ally Allston who tried to persuade her not to go down the same path as her father did.
 Maryann Cushing (portrayed by Carmen Aguirre) - The mother of Kyle and the grandmother of Sarah and Sophie who attends Sarah's quinceañera.
 General Hardcastle (portrayed by Patricia Drake) - The superior of Mitch Anderson who reprimands him for the DOD's poor relationship with Superman under his watch.
 Sandra Vance (portrayed by Laura Drummond) - The mother of Jessie Vance who attended her funeral. She scolded Mitch Anderson for sending her daughter to her death.
 Aubrey (portrayed by Djouliet Amara) - A girl from Clover that Sarah met at camp and had a brief kiss with her. She later came from  upon being called by Sarah to talk about what is going on with her parents. As the daughter of divorced parents, Aubrey advised Sarah to talk to her father. Before heading back to Clover, Aubrey and Sarah agreed to remain friends.
 Balcomb (portrayed by Lossen Chambers) - The principal of Smallville High School. In season three, Principal Balcomb informs Lana about the mold in Smallville High School.
 Mickey Jeroux (portrayed by Kenny Wood-Schatz) - A townie who is a rival X-Kryptonite dealer of Candice.
 Rahim Olowe (portrayed by Broadus Mattison) - The father of Denise and proprietor of Brit and Dunn's.
 Barb Dodge (portrayed by Nancy Kerr) - A citizen of Smallville. She blamed Jonathan for getting football at Smallville High School cancelled until Lana gets her to back off.
 Beau Besser (portrayed by Hilda Martin) - 
 Meghan (portrayed by Madeleine Kelders) - A follower of Ally Allston who leaves her group upon getting tired of waiting for Ally Allston to return from Bizarro World.

Introduced in season three
 Dr. Irons (portrayed by Angel Parker) - A physician in Metropolis who is the sister of this Earth's John Henry Irons. She tells Lois about her brother selling weapons to Bruno Mannheim and later has Lois come in for some additional tests.

See also
 List of DC Comics characters
 List of Arrowverse actors

References

Superman and Lois
Superman and Lois
Superman and Lois
Superman & Lois characters